Herpetophobia is a common specific phobia, which consists of fear or aversion to reptiles, commonly lizards and snakes, and similar vertebrates as amphibians. It is one of the most diffused  animal phobias, very similar and related to ophidiophobia. This condition causes a slight to severe emotional reaction, as for example anxiety, panic attack or most commonly nausea.

See also
Zoophobia
Ophidiophobia
List of animal phobias

References

External links

Zoophobias